The rail war began in different regions of Russia in the spring of 2022 after a similar rail war in Belarus.

According to The Insider's summary of media reports, at least 63 freight trains derailed in Russia between March and June 2022, about one and a half times more than during the same period in 2021.

Organizations 
Responsibility for the "rail war" was assumed by representatives of the "Combat Organization of Anarcho-Communists". In particular, they delayed the arrival of trains to the military unit in the Vladimir Oblast, where the arsenal of the main missile and artillery department of the Russian Defense Ministry is located.

In mid 2022, a second group, the "Stop the Wagons" movement, was created to engage in sabotage on railways in Russia.

Also, the Belarusian organization "Busly Lyatsyats" took responsibility for some of the partisan actions carried out on the infrastructure of the Russian Railways.

Actions

24 February–December 2022

On 26 April, an inert mine was discovered along a railway track in Bryansk.

On 1 May, in Kursk Oblast, a bridge on the Sudzha— railway collapsed. The governor declared it an act of sabotage. A criminal investigation was launched.

1 January 2023–present
Civilian trains and military convoys were blocked by partisan sabotage during the night from 3–4 January 2023 on a part of the Trans-Siberian Railway passing through Krasnoyarsk, in the sixth railway sabotage incident of 2023.

Reactions 
On the first day of the full-scale Russian invasion of Ukraine, 24 February 2022, the Russian Ministry of Transport ordered to increase the level of security on the railways in the southern regions of Russia. In April, Ukraine's Main Intelligence Directorate published what it said was a telegram sent by the heads of railroad sections in the Rostov and Krasnodar regions calling for cooperation with the authorities to protect the railways.

In June, RZhD-Partner magazine wrote, citing Goszheldornadzor, that more than 55% of freight train accidents in the previous four months were related to the state of the railway tracks. At the same time, the FSB at least once reported on the detention of people who had allegedly prepared acts of sabotage at a "transport infrastructure facility" in the Belgorod Region.

See also 

 2022 rail war in Belarus

References 

Resistance movements
Opposition to Vladimir Putin
2022 in Russia
Acts of sabotage
Rail transport in Russia
Resistance during the 2022 Russian invasion of Ukraine